Luciano (born Patrick Großmann; 28 January 1994) is a German rapper of Mozambican descent from Berlin.

The son of a Mozambican father and a German mother, Luciano grew up mostly in the Schöneberg district of Berlin.  He published his first pieces on the Locosquad YouTube channel.  A little later followed the first mixtape 12812. He achieved his breakthrough with the piece Jagen die Mio, which he published with his friend Nikky Santoro.  This was followed by another mixtape called Banditorinho.

He is a member of Locosquad and a part of the rap duo $kelleto and Azzi Memo. His first song was produced by Skaf Films. At the time producer Gentian was the director.  As of March 2019, his highest solo single placing in Germany is number three with the song "Meer". He has also reached number one as a featured artist on Capital Bra's "Roli Glitzer Glitzer".

Discography

Studio albums

Mixtapes

Singles

As lead artist

As featured artist

Other charted songs

Awards and nominations

Results

References

German rappers
Living people
Musicians from Berlin
1994 births